Love Drunk is the 
second album by the American 
pop rock band Boys Like Girls, released on September 8, 2009 by Columbia Records. The album was recorded in New York City and Vancouver because there are "two different producers/production teams, two different environments, and two different styles of inspiration" stated by the band's frontman Martin Johnson. The album peaked at #8 on the Billboard 200, making it the biggest hit for the band. Its lead single, the title track was released on July 7, 2009 shortly followed by "She's Got a Boyfriend Now", "Two Is Better Than One" featuring Taylor Swift, and "Heart Heart Heartbreak". This is the last album to feature bassist Bryan Donahue before his departure in 2011.

Production
"Love Drunk", "Two Is Better Than One", "Contagious", and "The First One" were recorded at Van Howes Studios in Vancouver, Canada, with producer Brian Howes and engineer Jay "JVP" Van Poederooyen.  Poederooyen digitally edited the songs, with assistance from Bryan "Tatoo" Coisne; Misha Rajaratnam did additional editing. "Heart Heart Heartbreak", "She's Got a Boyfriend Now", "Real Thing", "The Shot Heard 'Round the World", "Chemicals Collide", and "Go" were recorded at Fresh Kills Music in New York City, with producers S*A*M and Sluggo; Johnson co-produced the songs. Sean Gould engineered the tracks, with assistance from Grant Michaels.

Mark Caffrey did drum and bass engineering at Monster Island Recording Studios, also in New York City. Mark Maxwell did additional production on "Heart Heart Heartbreak", "She's Got a Boyfriend Now", "Real Thing", "The Shot Heard 'Round the World", and "Chemicals Collide". Chad Royce and Scott Mann engineered strings at Right Hook Studios, also in New York City. Tom Lord-Alge mixed the album at South Beach Studios in Miami, Florida, with assistance from Femio Hernandez, before it was mastered by Vlado Meller at Universal Mastering in New York City.

Development and release
On May 20, 2009 the band posted a street team announcement about "participating in various online and street promotions to help BLG get the word out about the new album." On June 18, Love Drunk was announced for release in September. On June 25, 2009 at around 10:15AM, the band streamed "Love Drunk" on their MySpace site. "Love Drunk" was released as a single on July 6. In the same month, the band went on tour with Never Shout Never and the Ready Set. On the radio show Kidd Kraddick in the Morning, an acoustic version of "Two Is Better Than One" was premiered. In August 2009, the band performed at the Summer Sonic Festival in Japan. "Heart Heart Heartbreak" was released on the band's PureVolume on August 17, as a result of reaching 250,000 fans on their Facebook. A 30-second preview of every song on the album was subsequently uploaded to YouTube, and then began officially streaming on their MySpace. Love Drunk was released on September 8 through major label Columbia Records. A deluxe edition of Love Drunk was released through iTunes exclusively from October 2–4. In October and November 2009, the band embarked on a headlining US tour, with support from Cobra Starship, the Maine, A Rocket to the Moon and VersaEmerge.

The album peaked at #8 on the Billboard 200 in its first week of release. News of an official Mark Hoppus remix of "Love Drunk" spread and it was confirmed as an exclusive track of the Love Drunk deluxe edition album. An exclusive Sean Kingston remix of "Love Drunk" was then confirmed on November 12 to be released on the iTunes Store as part of the Love Drunk EP, including acoustic versions of both "Love Drunk" and "She's Got a Boyfriend Now". The EP became available to purchase on January 5, 2010.

Singles
"Love Drunk" is the title track and lead single of the album. It was released to iTunes on June 30, 2009 and sent to mainstream radio on July 6, 2009. The music video features Ashley Tisdale.

"She's Got a Boyfriend Now" was released as a digital single on September 15, 2009.

"Two Is Better Than One" is a collaboration with Taylor Swift and the official second single from Love Drunk. The single was released for airplay on October 19, 2009.

"Heart Heart Heartbreak" is the album's third single. The song was officially sent to U.S. radio on April 13, 2010.

Track listing
Writing credits per booklet.

Love Drunk EP

Personnel
Personnel per booklet.

Boys Like Girls
 Martin Johnson – lead vocals, guitar, background vocals (tracks 2, 4, 5 and 9)
 John Keefe – drums
 Bryan Donahue – bass
 Paul DiGiovanni – guitar

Additional musicians
 Brian Howes – additional guitars (tracks 2, 4, 5 and 9), keyboards (tracks 2, 4, 5 and 9), background vocals (tracks 2, 4, 5 and 9)
 Jay "JVP" Van Poederooyen – programming (tracks 2, 4, 5 and 9), keyboards (tracks 2, 4, 5 and 9), percussion (tracks 2, 4, 5 and 9)
 The Vancouver Mafia – background vocals (tracks 2, 4, 5 and 9)
 Vince Jones – piano (track 4)
 David Campbell – strings arranger (track 4), conductor (track 4)
 Joel Derouin – concertmaster (track 4)
 Charlie Bisharat – violins (track 4)
 Josefina Vergara – violins (track 4)
 Philip Vaiman – violins (track 4)
 Sara Parkins – violins (track 4)
 Julian Hallmark – violins (track 4)
 Mario Deleon – violins (track 4)
 Steve Richards – cellos (track 4)
 Rudy Stein – cellos (track 4)
 Chad Royce – additional keyboards (track 7), programming (track 7), strings arranger (track 11), strings engineer (track 11)
 Scott Mann – additional keyboards (track 7), programming (track 7), strings arranger (track 11), strings engineer (track 11)
 David Eggar – cello (track 11)
 Antoine Silverman – violin (track 11)

Production
 Brian Howes – producer (tracks 2, 4, 5 and 9)
 Jay "JVP" Van Poederooyen – engineer (tracks 2, 4, 5 and 9), digital editing (tracks 2, 4, 5 and 9)
 Bryan "Tatoo" Coisne – assistant (tracks 2, 4, 5 and 9)
 Misha Rajaratnam – additional editing (tracks 2, 4, 5 and 9)
 S*A*M and Sluggo – producer (tracks 1, 3, 6–8, 10 and 11)
 Martin Johnson – co-producer (tracks 1, 3, 6–8, 10 and 11)
 Sean Gould – engineer (tracks 1, 3, 6–8, 10 and 11)
 Grant Michaels – assistant (tracks 1, 3, 6–8, 10 and 11)
 Mike Caffrey – drum and bass engineering (tracks 1, 3, 6–8, 10 and 11)
 Mark Maxwell – additional production (tracks 1, 3, 6, 8 and 10)
 Tom Lord-Alge – mixing
 Femio Hernandez – assistant
 Vlado Meller – mastering

Design
 Dan Gillan – back cover
 Clay Patrick McBride – inside photo
 Invisible Creature – art direction
 Ryan Clark – design

Chart performance

References

Boys Like Girls albums
2009 albums
Columbia Records albums